Narnatumab is a human monoclonal antibody designed for the treatment of cancer. Clinical development was abandoned after phase I trials.

Narnatumab was developed by ImClone Systems.

References 

Monoclonal antibodies
Abandoned drugs